Acca lanuginosa is a species of plant in the Myrtaceae family that is related to the much more commonly known Pineapple guava. It is endemic to Peru and is considered Vulnerable by the IUCN.

References

Flora of Peru
Myrtaceae
Vulnerable plants
Taxonomy articles created by Polbot